Pyotr Naumovich Fomenko  (13 July 1932 in Moscow – 9 August 2012 in Moscow) was a Soviet and Russian film and theater director, teacher, artistic director of the Moscow theater  Pyotr Fomenko Workshop. Created 60 productions in theaters in Moscow, St. Petersburg, Tbilisi, Wroclaw, Salzburg and Paris.

For the director's characteristic manner Fomenko imaginative and paradoxical thinking, building performance based on the principle of ironic comparison of contrasting episodes; his works vividly theatrical and musical are different brilliant actor's ensembles.

In a number of productions of the late 1970s - early 1980s, Fomenko has experimented in the genre of tragic grotesque.

Television productions are peculiar director in-depth psychology, strict adherence to the idea of the author's and style  ю

In 2000 he taught at the Paris Conservatoire, then staged performances at the Comédie Française (2003).

In 2001 he released the last course students. In 2003 he left the department in directing RATI (GITIS) and the official left the theater pedagogy, which has given more than 20 years of life. Among the students Fomenko directors Sergei Zhenovach, Ivan Popovski, Oleg Rybkin, Elena Nevezhina, Vladimir Epifantsev, Mindaugas Karbauskis, Sergei Puskepalis, Alexey Burago, Nikolay Druchek, the actors Igor Ugolnikov, Galina Tyunina, sisters Polina and Ksenia Kutepova, Madlen  Dzhabrailova, Polina Agureeva, Andrei Kazakov, Kirill Pirogov, Ilya Lyubimov, Yevgeny Tsyganov.

He died in Moscow on 9 August 2012 and was buried on 13 August in Vagankovo Cemetery.

Honours and awards
Honored Worker of Culture of Poland (1979).
Honored Artist of the RSFSR (1987) - for services to the Soviet theatrical art.
People's Artist of the Russian Federation (1993).
 State Prize of the Russian Federation (1994, 1997, 2001).
 Golden Mask (1995, 2002, 2006).
 Crystal Turandot (1993).
 Order For Merit to the Fatherland 2nd (2007), 3rd (2003), 4th (1996) class.
 Ordre des Arts et des Lettres (2005).

References

External links

 Пётр Фоменко на Страницах московской театральной жизни

1932 births
2012 deaths
Mass media people from Moscow
Soviet film directors
Russian theatre directors
Russian film directors
French theatre directors
Recipients of the Order "For Merit to the Fatherland", 2nd class
Recipients of the Order "For Merit to the Fatherland", 3rd class
People's Artists of Russia
Commandeurs of the Ordre des Arts et des Lettres
State Prize of the Russian Federation laureates
Burials at Vagankovo Cemetery
Theatre people from Moscow
Soviet theatre directors